{{Infobox saint
|name         = Nasir Khusraw
|image=
|imagesize= 
|caption=
|titles       = Pir, poet, theologian, philosopher, scientist, traveler, missionary
|birth_date   = 1004 CE
|birth_place  = Qabodiyon, Khuttal, Khorasan, Ghaznavid Empire (modern Tajikistan)
|death_date   = after 1070 
|death_place  = Yamgan, Khorasan, Ghorid dynasty (modern Afghanistan)
|major_shrine = Tomb of Nasir Khusrav Yamgan, Afghanistan
|attributes   = Dā'ī al-Mutlaq to Fatimid Caliph Abū Tamīm Ma'add al-Mustanṣir bi-llāh and Hujjat al-Islam for Pamiris in Turkestan and Badakhshan<ref>{{cite book|author=Balcıoğlu, Tahir Harimî|author-link=:tr:Tahir Harimî Balcıoğlu|title=Türk tarihinde mezhep cereyanları |url=https://issuu.com/yuceltr/docs/tahir_harimi_balc__o__lu_-_t__rk_ta |editor=Hilmi Ziya Ülken |editor-link=:tr:Hilmi Ziya Ülken |publisher=Kanaat Yayınları, Ahmed Sait tab'ı |place=İstanbul |pages=136 |year=1940 |language=tr}} Chapter on Mısır Fâtımîleri ve Aleviler'in Pamir Teşkilâtı.</ref>
|influences   = Isma'ilism,Mu'ayyad fi'l-Din al-Shirazi
|tradition    = Sufi poetry, Ismaili scholar
|influenced=
|major_works  = Safarnama, Wajh-i-Din, Zaad al-Musafirin, Sa'datnama, Rawshana-i-nama
|quote=
}}

Abu Mo’in Hamid ad-Din Nasir ibn Khusraw al-Qubadiani or Nāsir Khusraw Qubādiyānī Balkhi also spelled as Nasir Khusrow and Naser Khosrow (1004 – after 1070 CE) was a Persian poet, philosopher, Isma'ili scholar, traveler and one of the greatest writers in Persian literature. He was born in Qabodiyon, a village in Bactria in the ancient Greater Iranian province of Khorasan, now in modern Tajikistan and died in Yamagan, now Afghanistan.

He is considered one of the great poets and writers in Persian literature. The Safarnama, an account of his travels, is his most famous work and remains required reading in Iran even today.

Life
Nasir Khusraw was born in 1004 AD, in Qabodiyon. He was well versed in the branches of the natural sciences, medicine, mathematics, astronomy and astrology, Greek philosophy, and the writings of al-Kindi, al-Farabi and Ibn Sina; and in the interpretation of the Qur'an. He also studied Arabic, Turkish, Greek, the vernacular languages of India and Sindh, and perhaps even Hebrew; and had visited Multan and Lahore, and the splendid Ghaznavid court under Sultan Mahmud, Firdousi's patron. He later chose Merv for his residence, and was the owner of a house and garden there.

Until A.H. 437 (1046 AD), he worked as a financial secretary and revenue collector for the Seljuk sultan Toghrul Beg, or rather for his brother Jaghir Beg, the emir of Khorasan, who had conquered Merv in 1037. At around this time, inspired by a heavenly voice in a dream, he abjured all the luxuries of his life, and resolved upon a pilgrimage to the holy shrines of Mecca and Medina, hoping to find there the solution to his spiritual crisis.

The graphic description of this journey is contained in the Safarnama, which still possesses special value among books of travel, as it contains the most authentic account of the state of the Muslim world in the middle of the 11th century. The minute sketches of Jerusalem and its environs are even today of practical value.

During the seven years of his 19,000-kilometre journey (1046–1052), Nasir visited Mecca four times, and performed all the rites and observances of a zealous pilgrim; but he was far more attracted by Cairo, the capital of Egypt, and the residence of the Fatimid caliph-imam Ma'ad al-Mustansir Billah, the Imam of the Ismaili Shi'a Muslims, which was just then waging a deadly war against the Abbasid caliph of Baghdad, and Toghrul Beg the Seljuk, the great defender of the Sunni creed. At the very time of Nasir's visit to Cairo, the power of the Egyptian Fatimids was in its zenith; Syria, the Hejaz, Africa, and Sicily obeyed al-Mustansir's sway, and the utmost order, security and prosperity reigned in Egypt.

At Cairo, he learned mainly under the Fatimid dā‘ī ("missionary") Mu'ayyad fid-Din al-Shirazi, and became thoroughly imbued with the Shi'a Isma'ili doctrines of the Fatimids, and their introduction into his native country was henceforth the sole object of his life. He was raised to the position of dā‘ī "missionary" and appointed as the Hujjat-i Khorasan, though the hostility he encountered in the propagation of these new religious ideas after his return to Greater Khorasan in 1052 A.D. and Sunnite fanaticism compelled him at last to flee. After wandering from place to place, he found refuge in Yamgan (about 1060 A.D.) in the mountains of Badakhshan, where he spent as a hermit the last decades of his life, gathering a considerable number of devoted adherents, who have handed down his doctrines to succeeding generations.

Nasir-i Khusraw explained that through revelation (tanzil), intellectual matters were transformed into a state that could be understood by humankind. Esoteric interpretation (ta’wil) is necessary to revert them to their original intellectual state. He also said that one must not be satisfied with the exoteric form but look for the person who can explain the original esoteric meaning to them. In saying this he alluded to the Imam of the Time.

He died in Yamagan in present-day northern Afghanistan.

Works
SafarnamaSafarnama (The Book of Travels) is his most famous work. He visited dozens of cities in about seven years (March 6, 1046 – October 23, 1052) and wrote comprehensively about them, including details about colleges, caravanserais, mosques, scientists, kings, the public, the population, the area of the cities, and, of course, his interesting memories. After 1000 years, his Safarnama is still readable for Persian-speaking people.

Diwan
Among his other works, most of the lyrical poems in his Diwan were composed in his retirement, and their chief topics are an enthusiastic praise of Ali, his descendants, and al-Mustansir in particular, along with passionate outcries against Khorasan and its rulers, who had driven him from his home. It also explores his immense satisfaction with the quiet solitude of Yumgan, and his utter despondency again in seeing himself despised by his former associates and excluded from participation in the glorious contest of life. Scattered through all these alternating outbursts of hope and despair, there are lessons of morality, and solemn warnings against the tricks and perfidy of the world, the vanity of all earthly splendour and greatness, the folly and injustice of men, and the hypocrisy, frivolity and viciousness of fashionable society and princely courts in particular.

Gushayish va Rahayish
Another work of Nasir Khusraw is the Persian philosophical work "Gushayis va Rahayish" which has been translated into English by F.M. Hunzai under the title: "Knowledge and Liberation". The work discusses creation, questions related to the soul, epistemology, creation, and Ismaili Islamic doctorines. From a linguistic point of view, the work is an example of early philosophical writing in new Persian.

It is the same strain which runs, although in a somewhat lower key, through his two larger masnavis, the Rawshana-i-nama (or Book of Enlightenment, also known as Shish Fasl), and the Sa'datnama (Book of Felicity). The former is divided into two sections: the first, of a metaphysical character, contains a sort of practical cosmography, chiefly based on Avicenna's theories, but frequently intermixed both with the freer speculations of the well-known philosophical brotherhood of Basra, the Ikhwan al-Safa, and purely Shi'ite or Isma'ili ideas; the second, or ethical section of the poem, abounds in moral maxims and ingenious thoughts on man's good and bad qualities, on the necessity of shunning the company of fools and double-faced friends, on the deceptive allurements of the world and the secret snares of ambitious men craving for rank and wealth. It concludes with an imaginary vision of a beautiful work of spirits who have stripped off the fetters of earthly cares and sorrows and revel in the pure light of divine wisdom and love.

If we compare this with a similar allegory in Nasir's Diwan, which culminates in the praise of Mustansir, we are fairly entitled to look upon it as a covert allusion to the eminent men who revealed to the poet in Cairo the secrets of the Isma'ili faith, and showed him what he considered the heavenly ladder to superior knowledge and spiritual bliss.

A similar series of excellent teachings on practical wisdom and the blessings of a virtuous life, only of a more severe and uncompromising character, is contained in the Sa'datnama; and, judging from the extreme bitterness of tone manifested in the reproaches of kings and emirs, we should be inclined to consider it a protest against the vile aspersions poured out upon Nasir's moral and religious attitude during those persecutions which drove him at last to Yumgan.

Of all other works of the author, the Zaad al-Musafirin (or Travelling Provisions of Pilgrims) and the Wajh-i-Din (or The Face of Religion) are theoretical descriptions of his religious and philosophical principles; the rest of them can be dismissed as being probably just as apocryphal as Nasir's famous autobiography (found in several Persian tadhkiras or biographies of poets), a mere forgery of the most extravagant description, which is mainly responsible for the confusion in names and dates in older accounts of our author.

 Wajh-i din
Nasir Khusraw, explains the spiritual interpretation of the tradition of a six day creation of the physical universe. He writes about how the story of creation is a symbolic explanation of what happened when God created the universe. Interpreting it literally is something human beings do based on the limits of their intellects. In the scriptures, when it says that God began the work of creating the world on Sunday, completed it on Friday, and then rested on Saturday, it is not a literal account, rather a symbolic one.

When the Prophets shared the story of a six-day creation of the physical universe, it was meant for the people to understand that God was saying that six prophets would come into this world and command people to work. When the seventh day came, God would not command in this manner, but would rather reward them for their hard work.

Book on Mathematics
Nasir Khusraw wrote a book on mathematics which has now been lost. He states in his other work that he could: not find one single scholar throughout all of Khorasan and eastern lands like myself [who] could grapple with the solutions to these problems''. But he felt it his responsibility to take the task for readers he would never see, 'those yet to come, in a time yet to come'

Jami al hikmatayn

Poetry
Nasir Khusraw loved the Persian language and hated poets like 'Unsuri who, rather than give a realistic portrayal of Mahmud of Ghazna, found ways to extol his deeds. The following poem speaks to this aspect of Khusraw's poetry.

        Reproach Not the Firmament!
            By Nasir-i Khusrau
          Translated by Iraj Bashiri
         Copyright, Iraj Bashiri, 2004

     Reproach not the Firmament deep and blue,
     Forget thy stubborn nature to reveal a clue.
 
     Neither expect from the Firmament any joy,
     When your own star you knowingly destroy.
 
     Fruitless trees are, at best, fuel for fire, 
     Fruitless men, alike, to oblivion retire.
 
     Forget about fragrant tresses and lips sweet,
     About hedges, and tulip cheeks to greet.
 
     Lavish not praise on a filthy creature,
     With dastardly deeds as its only feature.
 
     Adore not with verse the Lie or the Greed,
     Smite down the infidels’ most cherished creed.
 
     Be not Unsuri, who groveling worshiped Mahmud,
     Lavished on him all flattery and paean he could.
 
     I pledge never to sprinkle before the swine,
     These precious, peerless Dari pearls of mine.

The poetry of Nasir Khusraw is replete with advice and wisdom. Being the representative of the Fatimid Imams in Khorasan, Nasir guided his followers through his poetry. His Persian poetry is enjoyed by the average Persian speaker of today and is taught in grade school. Some of the fables mentioned in his poems were eventually to find their way to the West. Among them is the story of The Gourd and the Palm-tree:

See also

List of Persian poets and authors
Persian literature
Mehdi Mohaghegh, noted researcher on Khusraw

Notes

References

Further reading

External links

Nasir Khusraw's works in original Persian at Ganjoor Persian Library
Naser Khosrow in jazirehdanesh (Persian)
Millenary Celebrations of Nasir Khusraw
Sayyidna Nasir Khusraw
Nasir Khusraw: Yesterday, Today, Tomorrow
Nasir Khusraw: The Ruby of Badakhshan
Nasir Khusraw: Fatimid Intellectual
Nasir Khusraw (Internet Encyclopedia of Philosophy)
Travelogue of Nasir Khusraw

11th-century Persian-language poets
11th-century Iranian philosophers
Islamic philosophers
Transoxanian Islamic scholars
11th-century people from the Fatimid Caliphate
1004 births
1088 deaths
People from Khatlon Region
Iranian Ismailis
Travel writers of the medieval Islamic world
11th-century Persian-language writers
Ismaili literature
11th-century Iranian scientists
Geography of Palestine (region)
Holy Land travellers
Medieval Palestine
11th-century Iranian geographers
Researchers of Persian literature
11th-century explorers